Kelly Jade Sotherton  (born 13 November 1976) is a British former heptathlete, long jumper and relay runner. In the heptathlon she was the bronze medallist at the 2004 Summer Olympics and, following the disqualification of two other athletes, also at the 2008 Summer Olympics, as well as being part of the bronze medal-winning team in the Women's 4x400m relay at the 2008 Summer Olympics (again, initially finishing 5th but upgraded after various subsequent doping disqualifications). As such she is one of only five women to win multiple medals in Olympic heptathlon. She also won a bronze at the 2007 World Championships in Athletics, and was the heptathlon gold medallist at the 2006 Commonwealth Games. Indoors, Sotherton was a World silver medallist, and twice European silver medallist in pentathlon, in which she was ranked seventh all-time in 2022.

As the scale of her accomplishments at global level became clear in hindsight, Sotherton was increasingly recognised as fully part of a line of world class British pentathletes/heptathletes that included Mary Rand, Mary Peters, Judy Simpson, Denise Lewis, Jessica Ennis-Hill and Katarina Johnson-Thompson, her multiple global medals between 2004 and 2008 bridging the gap between the Olympic triumphs of Lewis and Ennis-Hill.

In November 2010, she announced her decision to retire from the heptathlon, due to foot and back injuries. After considering switching to cycling, she then chose instead to focus on the 400 m winning her only National title in 2011. Sotherton's funding from UK Athletics was cut in 2011, but while she returned to heptathlon training, she failed to qualify for the 2012 Summer Olympics ahead of reigning Commonwealth champion Louise Hazel, World (and eventual Olympic) champion Ennis Hill or future World and Commonwealth champion Katarina Johnson-Thompson and Sotherton retired from elite competitive athletics for the final time shortly thereafter.

Early life and education
Sotherton was born in Newport, Isle of Wight on 13 November 1976. She began her athletics career in the sports day at Caversham House Primary School in Ryde, Isle of Wight. She was subsequently educated at Bishop Lovett Middle School, Ryde High School and Brunel University.

Career
As a teenager, Sotherton played netball for the Isle of Wight, and won two English Schools' championships in the heptathlon. She moved to the Midlands in 1998, to become a member of Birchfield Harriers athletics club. She made her senior British team debut in 2002.

2004
She gained international recognition in 2004 when she unexpectedly won a bronze medal at the Summer Olympics in Athens behind Carolina Klüft (gold) and Austra Skujytė (silver), scoring 6424 points and finishing ahead of defending Olympic champion Lewis, who dropped out due to injury.

She was famously criticised for settling for the bronze medal instead of chasing the silver in the final event, the 800m, by her coach Charles van Commenee.

2005
In March 2005 she competed in the European Indoor Championships, where she took silver once again behind Klüft. At Götzis, Austria in May Sotherton was again beaten into second, behind the Swede, but she did record a personal best of 6547 points. At the AAA's National Championship in July, Sotherton competed in four individual events and took her first senior national title, winning the long jump with a jump of 6.48 metres.

At the 2005 World Championships Sotherton had held a medal position going into the sixth event, despite some below average performances, but a disastrous javelin saw her drop out of contention. Sotherton did manage to knock nearly 2.5 seconds off her personal best to win the final 800 m, but despite closing the overall gap on those ahead she only finished fifth.

2006
In March 2006 Sotherton competed for England in the heptathlon at the Commonwealth Games in Melbourne. She took gold with a score of 6396, ahead of Kylie Wheeler of Australia (silver) and her teammate Jessica Ennis (bronze). In August 2006 she competed for Great Britain and Northern Ireland in the heptathlon at the 2006 European Athletics Championships in Gothenburg. She came seventh ahead of her teammate Jessica Ennis, after a disappointing javelin event caused her to drop from second.

2007

2007 saw Great Britain host the European Indoor Championships, in Birmingham. Klüft led after the hurdles, but Sotherton and compatriot Jessica Ennis trailed closely behind. The high jump saw Ennis take the lead over Klüft and Sotherton, with a jump of 1.91, but Sotherton set a personal best for indoors of 1.88. Seven points separated Klüft and Sotherton. In the shot put, Sotherton took a two-point lead ahead of defending champion Klüft. The long jump saw Klüft take a 24-point lead over the Briton. In the 800 m, a strong event for Sotherton, she needed to take 1.6 seconds from Klüft to see her beaten for the first time since 2002. Sotherton set a personal best 2:12.54, but Klüft also underscored her previous mark to win by 17 points. This was her smallest winning margin ever. Sotherton took silver, and Karin Ruckstuhl the bronze. In one of the best pentathlons of all time, many athletes set national records and Klüft and Sotherton rose to second and fourth on the all-time lists respectively. Sotherton also set a Commonwealth record by 200 points.

In 2007, the World Championships were held in the Japanese city of Osaka. Sotherton started the first day with a personal best of 13.21 seconds in the 100 metres hurdles. She then came within a centimetre of her personal best in the high jump with a 1.86 m performance. A season's best of 14.14 m followed in the shot put and Sotherton ended the day with a second personal best in the 200 m, with 23.40. On the second day, Sotherton hit 6.68 m in the long jump, to stay in medal contention, but again the javelin saw a weak performance, with Sotherton throwing just 31.90, finishing last. However, Sotherton put in a strong performance in the 800 m, running 2:11.58 to just beat teammate Jessica Ennis to the bronze medal, with 6,510 points.

2008–09
In February 2008, Sotherton competed in a three-event triathlon, at the Indoor Grand Prix, in Birmingham, against a field including Carolina Klüft. Sotherton started with a below-par performance in the long jump, allowing Klüft to take the lead. Sotherton then won the 60 m hurdles in a personal best of 8.17 seconds. Despite running a personal best (and the fastest time by a Briton that season) of 52.47 seconds in the 400m, Sotherton took second behind Klüft, who won by 18 points.

After Klüft pulled out of the World Indoor Championships in Valencia, Sotherton became favourite for the gold medal. She lived up to expectation in the 60 m hurdles, winning in 8.25 seconds. However, Sotherton put in a below-par performance in the high jump, achieving only 1.81 m, against Tia Hellebaut's 1.99 m., and Sotherton slipped to third and then to fifth after the shot put. Sotherton then won the long jump with 6.45 m, moving into second, behind Hellebaut, who set a Belgian record of 6.41 m. Hellebaut held a considerable lead entering the final event, the 800 m. Sotherton needed to beat the Belgian by 7.7 seconds to win gold. Sotherton set a personal best of 2:09.95, with Hellebaut collapsing over the line in 2:16.42, 6.47 seconds behind Sotherton, and the Briton had to again settle for silver.

After Klüft's retirement from heptathlon in 2008, Sotherton had been tipped by many people to take gold at the 2008 Olympics, including Klüft herself. However, after a disappointing performance she could only manage 5th place in the competition. Lyudmila Blonska was later disqualified for failing a doping test and Sotherton was upgraded to fourth. She had previously labelled Blonska a cheat, and questioned the validity of Blonska's silver medal at the World Championships in 2007. In December 2017 Tatyana Chernova was disqualified from 3rd place in the competition for doping, promoting Sotherton to the bronze medal. She was also part of the 4 × 400 m relay team which finished fifth in the final although the team was later upgraded to bronze medal position following disqualification for doping offences of the teams finishing in third and fourth place.

Sotherton received her bronze medal from the 4x400 metre relay at the London Anniversary Games on 21 July 2018 along with her teammates. She then received her second bronze medal from the Heptathlon two months later on 13 September at the Team GB ball in London.

The following year, Sotherton struggled with injuries and although she was selected for the 2009 European Indoor Championships she had to withdraw due to heel problems. Despite recovering from this injury, her 2010 season was also ruined by injury as her back problems recurred.

2011
Sotherton completed "the first step of her reinvention as a 400m specialist", with a victory in the 400m final in 53.46 sec, at the English Institute of Sport - Sheffield indoor arena on 13 February 2011. Overcome at her win, she explained a temporary breakdown at trackside; " When I prolapsed the disc in my back it was career-threatening. I had to make a decision whether to end my career or try something new." It was Sotherton's first national title in a track event.

2012
On Sunday 27 May 2012, Sotherton announced her retirement from the sport after failing to recover from back surgery in time for the London 2012 games.

Post-retirement
Since retiring in 2012, Sotherton has been on UKsport international leaderships programme and ACGP (corporate governance practitioner). She appears in the media, commentating and guesting on various productions including those by Talksport and FiveLive, and undertakes public speaking engagements. She coaches and mentors in Athletics, and is part of the Sports People's Think Tank alongside footballer Jason Roberts.

She participated in the 2013 London Marathon in aid of Age UK, the Deloitte Ride Across Britain from Lands End to John O'Groats, the Prudential London Triathlon, and a marathon row for cancer research.

Sotherton was appointed Member of the Order of the British Empire (MBE) in the 2020 New Year Honours for services to track and field athletics and the promotion of women's sport.

Sotherton is a performance coach and specialises in running. She has worked with Wasps Rugby and Warwickshire CC. In February 2020, it was announced that Sotherton would lead the Athletics Team at the 2022 Birmingham Commonwealth Games, her home city.

Personal bests

International competitions

References

External links 
 
MTC Talent profile

1976 births
Living people
People from Newport, Isle of Wight
English heptathletes
British heptathletes
British female long jumpers
English female long jumpers
Olympic heptathletes
Olympic athletes of Great Britain
Olympic bronze medallists for Great Britain
Olympic bronze medalists in athletics (track and field)
Athletes (track and field) at the 2004 Summer Olympics
Athletes (track and field) at the 2008 Summer Olympics
Medalists at the 2004 Summer Olympics
English Olympic medallists
Commonwealth Games medallists in athletics
Commonwealth Games gold medallists for England
Athletes (track and field) at the 2006 Commonwealth Games
World Athletics Championships athletes for Great Britain
World Athletics Championships medalists
British Athletics Championships winners
AAA Championships winners
Birchfield Harriers
Alumni of Brunel University London
Members of the Order of the British Empire
Medallists at the 2006 Commonwealth Games